Aganosma is a genus of plants in family Apocynaceae first described as a genus in 1837. It is native to China, the Indian Subcontinent, and Southeast Asia.

Species
 Aganosma breviloba Kerr - Guizhou, Myanmar, Thailand 
 Aganosma cymosa (Roxb.) G.Don - Guangxi, Yunnan, Bangladesh, Assam, Sri Lanka, Indochina 
 Aganosma gracilis Hook.f. - Assam, Bhutan, Arunachal Pradesh 
 Aganosma heynei (Spreng.) ined. (syn Echites heynei Spreng.) - India 
 Aganosma lacei Raizada - Myanmar 
 Aganosma petelotii Lý - N Vietnam 
 Aganosma schlechteriana H.Lév. - S China, Assam, N Indochina 
 Aganosma siamensis Craib - Thailand, Vietnam, Guangxi, Guizhou, Yunnan 
 Aganosma wallichii G.Don - Myanmar, Thailand, W Malaysia, Java, Sumatra

formerly included

References

 
Apocynaceae genera